Clydesdale Duncan Skene  (24 June 1884 – 29 December 1945) was a Scottish amateur footballer who played in the Scottish League for Falkirk, Queen's Park and Dundee as a centre forward.

Personal life 
Skene was the younger brother of fellow footballer Leslie Skene and attended Falkirk High School. He served as a corporal in the Royal Field Artillery during the First World War and was awarded the Military Medal for bravery in the field.

Career statistics

Honours 
Falkirk

 Falkirk Infirmary Shield: 1907–08

References

1884 births
Scottish footballers
Scottish Football League players
British Army personnel of World War I
Association football forwards
Queen's Park F.C. players
Royal Field Artillery soldiers
Stenhousemuir F.C. players
Falkirk F.C. players
Dundee F.C. players
Dunfermline Athletic F.C. players
Montrose F.C. players
1945 deaths
Recipients of the Military Medal
People educated at Falkirk High School
Footballers from Falkirk (council area)